Swimming events at the 2014 Asian Games was held at the Munhak Park Tae-hwan Aquatics Center in Incheon, South Korea from September 21 to 26, 2014. There were 38 long-course events: 19 for men and 19 for women.

Schedule

Medalists

Men

Women

Medal table

Participating nations
A total of 322 athletes from 34 nations competed in swimming at the 2014 Asian Games:

References

External links
Official website

 
2014 Asian Games events
Asian Games
2014
2014 Asian Games
International aquatics competitions hosted by South Korea